The Iraq FA Kirkuk League was the top-level division of football in Kirkuk between 1948 and 1973. It was controlled by the Kirkuk branch of the Iraq Football Association and was one of four regional league championships played in Iraq at the time, with the others being in Baghdad, Basra and Mosul. The first champions of the competition were Al-Dhahab Al-Aswad, who won the title in both the 1948–49 and 1949–50 seasons.

The regional leagues folded in 1973 and were replaced by the Iraqi National First Division.

List of champions

See also
 List of Iraqi football champions
 Iraqi Premier League
 Iraqi Women's Football League

References

External links
Iraqi Football Website

 
Football leagues in Iraq